Joachim Pierzyna (born 20 August 1939) is a Polish footballer. He played in one match for the Poland national football team in 1962.

References

External links
 

1939 births
Living people
Polish footballers
Poland international footballers
Place of birth missing (living people)
Association footballers not categorized by position